Ian Fairley (born 18 September 1964) is a former Australian rules footballer who played for North Melbourne during the 1980s and 1990s. A utility player, he was the club's leading goalkicker in 1989 and retired after winning the 1996 Grand Final with North Melbourne in which he kicked the final goal of the game. He is the father of Zachary Fairley

Before playing for North Melbourne, Fairley played for Williamstown in the Victorian Football Association. In 1980, he notably kicked eight goals against Box Hill in his senior VFA debut, at the age of only 15 years 9 months. Despite the performance, he was dropped from the senior team the following week, to ensure he remained eligibile to play finals for the Thirds. Fairley played 38 senior games for the VFA Seagulls from his debut in 1980 until early in the 1983 season when he crossed to North, kicking 85 goals and played in Williamstown's Seconds premiership side in 1980 and was runner-up in the Thirds best and fairest award the same year. He was runner-up in the Seniors' best and fairest in 1981 as well as the leading goalkicker with a total of 39 and was also awarded a trophy for the most consistent player. Fairley was named in a forward pocket in the WFC 1980's Team of the Decade.

Statistics

|-
|- style="background-color: #EAEAEA"
! scope="row" style="text-align:center" | 1983
|style="text-align:center;"|
| 37 || 6 || 15 || 5 || 27 || 9 || 36 || 10 ||  || 2.5 || 0.8 || 4.5 || 1.5 || 6.0 || 1.7 ||  || 0
|-
! scope="row" style="text-align:center" | 1984
|style="text-align:center;"|
| 6 || 9 || 27 || 16 || 79 || 13 || 92 || 48 ||  || 3.0 || 1.8 || 8.8 || 1.4 || 10.2 || 5.3 ||  || 0
|- style="background-color: #EAEAEA"
! scope="row" style="text-align:center" | 1985
|style="text-align:center;"|
| 6 || 5 || 4 || 2 || 34 || 10 || 44 || 13 ||  || 0.8 || 0.4 || 6.8 || 2.0 || 8.8 || 2.6 ||  || 0
|-
! scope="row" style="text-align:center" | 1986
|style="text-align:center;"|
| 6 || 17 || 18 || 9 || 165 || 54 || 219 || 68 ||  || 1.1 || 0.5 || 9.7 || 3.2 || 12.9 || 4.0 ||  || 0
|- style="background-color: #EAEAEA"
! scope="row" style="text-align:center" | 1987
|style="text-align:center;"|
| 6 || 21 || 26 || 13 || 184 || 60 || 244 || 95 || 14 || 1.2 || 0.6 || 8.8 || 2.9 || 11.6 || 4.5 || 0.7 || 3
|-
! scope="row" style="text-align:center" | 1988
|style="text-align:center;"|
| 6 || 14 || 12 || 14 || 137 || 38 || 175 || 64 || 10 || 0.9 || 1.0 || 9.8 || 2.7 || 12.5 || 4.6 || 0.7 || 1
|- style="background-color: #EAEAEA"
! scope="row" style="text-align:center" | 1989
|style="text-align:center;"|
| 6 || 18 || 28 || 11 || 150 || 62 || 212 || 67 || 14 || 1.6 || 0.6 || 8.3 || 3.4 || 11.8 || 3.7 || 0.8 || 2
|-
! scope="row" style="text-align:center" | 1990
|style="text-align:center;"|
| 6 || 14 || 7 || 0 || 123 || 41 || 164 || 38 || 14 || 0.5 || 0.0 || 8.8 || 2.9 || 11.7 || 2.7 || 1.0 || 1
|- style="background-color: #EAEAEA"
! scope="row" style="text-align:center" | 1991
|style="text-align:center;"|
| 6 || 21 || 1 || 1 || 178 || 62 || 240 || 72 || 15 || 0.0 || 0.0 || 8.5 || 3.0 || 11.4 || 3.4 || 0.7 || 0
|-
! scope="row" style="text-align:center" | 1992
|style="text-align:center;"|
| 6 || 16 || 5 || 5 || 132 || 33 || 165 || 36 || 7 || 0.3 || 0.3 || 8.3 || 2.1 || 10.3 || 2.3 || 0.4 || 0
|- style="background-color: #EAEAEA"
! scope="row" style="text-align:center" | 1993
|style="text-align:center;"|
| 6 || 14 || 3 || 0 || 101 || 33 || 134 || 22 || 13 || 0.2 || 0.0 || 7.2 || 2.4 || 9.6 || 1.6 || 0.9 || 0
|-
! scope="row" style="text-align:center" | 1994
|style="text-align:center;"|
| 6 || 19 || 2 || 0 || 185 || 51 || 236 || 59 || 11 || 0.1 || 0.0 || 9.7 || 2.7 || 12.4 || 3.1 || 0.6 || 0
|- style="background-color: #EAEAEA"
! scope="row" style="text-align:center" | 1995
|style="text-align:center;"|
| 6 || 19 || 0 || 0 || 152 || 56 || 208 || 38 || 11 || 0.0 || 0.0 || 8.0 || 2.9 || 10.9 || 2.0 || 0.6 || 0
|-
|style="text-align:center;background:#afe6ba;"|1996†
|style="text-align:center;"|
| 6 || 24 || 1 || 0 || 162 || 69 || 231 || 68 || 12 || 0.0 || 0.0 || 6.8 || 2.9 || 9.6 || 2.8 || 0.5 || 0
|- class="sortbottom"
! colspan=3| Career
! 217
! 149
! 76
! 1809
! 591
! 2400
! 698
! 121
! 0.7
! 0.4
! 8.3
! 2.7
! 11.1
! 3.2
! 0.7
! 7
|}

References

External links

1964 births
Living people
Australian rules footballers from Victoria (Australia)
North Melbourne Football Club players
North Melbourne Football Club Premiership players
Williamstown Football Club players
One-time VFL/AFL Premiership players